Below is a list of Ukrainian language exonyms for places in Europe. Note that this list only includes names that are significantly different from the local toponym.

Albania – Албанія/Albaniya 
Tiranë Тирана/Tyrana

Austria – Австрія/Avstriya 
Wien Відень/Viden'

Belarus – Білорусь/Bilorus' 
Brest Берестя/Berestia or Брест/Brest
Minsk Мінськ/Mins'k
Mogilev Могилів/Mohyliv
Pinsk Пінськ/Pins'k

China (People's Republic of) – Китай/Kytai 
Beijing Пекін/Pekin

Croatia – Хорватія/Khorvatiya 
Beli Manastir Білий Монастир/Bilyi Monastyr
Hrvatska Kostajnica Хорватська Костайниця/Khorvats'ka Kostainytsia
Ivanec Іванець/Ivanets'
Novi Vinodolski Новий Винодольський/Novyi Vynodol's'kyi

Denmark – Данія/Daniya 
København Копенгаген/Ghuma

France – Франція/Frantsiya 
Paris Париж/Paryzh

Italy – Італія/Italiya 
Firenze Флоренція/Florentsia
Genova Генуя/Henuia
Milano Мілан/Milan
Napoli /Neapol'
Roma Рим/Rym
Torino Турин/Turyn

Moldova – Молдова, Молдавія/Moldova, Moldaviya 
Alexeevca Олексіївка/Oleksiyivka
Anenii Noi Нові Анени/Novi Aneny
Brătușeni Братушани/Bratushany
Brătușenii Noi Нові Братушани/Novi Bratushany
Briceni Бричани/Brychany
Bucovăț Биковець/Bykovets'
Camenca Кам'янка/Kamyanka
Chişinău Кишинів/Kyshyniv
Dnestrovsc Дністровськ/Dnistrovs'k
Edineț Єдинці/Yedyntsi
Ocnița Окниця/Oknytsia
Orhei Оргіїв/Orhiyiv
Rîbnița Рибниця/Rybnytsia
Soroca Сороки/Soroky
Tighina Бендери/Bendery

Poland – Польща/Pol'shcha 
Augustów Августів/Avgustiv
Białystok Білосток/Bilostok
Chełm Холм/Kholm
Drohiczyn Дорогочин/Dorohochyn
Hrubieszów Грубешів/Hrubeshiv
Janów Lubelski Янів-Любельський/Ianiv-Liubels'kyi
Kock Коцьк/Kots'k
Kraków Краків/Krakiv
Krasnystaw Красностав/Krasnostav
Łódź Лодзь/Lodz'
Lubartów Любартів/Liubartiv
Łuków Луків/Lukiv
Międzyrzec Podlaski Межиріччя/Mezhyrichchia
Przemyśl Перемишль/Peremyshl'
Rzeszów Ряшів/Riashiv
Tarnogród Терногород/Ternohorod
Tomaszów Lubelski Томашів/Tomashiv
Tyszowce Тишівці/Tyshivtsi
Ustrzyki Dolne Устрики-Долішні/Ustryky-Dolishni
Włodawa Володава/Volodava
Zamość Замостя/Zamostia

Portugal – Португалія/Portuhaliya 
Lisboa Лісабон/Lisabon

Romania – Румунія/Rumuniya 

Bălcăuți Балківці/Balkivtsi
Bocicoiu Mare Великий Бичків/Velykyi Bychkiv
București Бухарест/Bukharest
Coștiui Коштіль/Koshtil'
Crăciunești Кричунів/Krychuniv
Crasna Vișeului Вишівська Красна/Vyshivs'ka Krasna
Lunca la Tisa Луг над Тисою/Luh nad Tysoyu
Poienile de sub Munte Поляни/Poliany
Remeți Remeta/Ремета
Repedea Кривий/Kryvyi
Rona de Sus Вишня Рівня/Vyshnia Rivnia
Ştiuca Щука/Shchuka
Tisa Миків/Mykiv
Tulcea Тулча/Tulcha
Valea Vișeului Вишівська Долина/Vyshivs'ka Dolyna
Vișeu de Jos Вишово-Нижнє/Vyshovo-Nyzhnie
Vişeu de Sus Вишово-Вижнє/Vyshovo-Vyzhnie

Russian Federation – Російська Федерація/Rosiys'ka Federatsiya
Belgorod Білгород/Bilhorod
Krasnodar Катеринодар/Katerynodar(historical)
Kursk Курськ/Kurs'k
Naberezhnye Chelny Набережні Човни/Naberezhi Chovny
Voronezh Вороніж/Voronizh
Rostov-on-Don Ростів/Rostiv(historical)
Saratov Саратів/Sarativ(historical)

Serbia 
Beograd Белград/Belhrad
Kragujevac Крагуєваць/Krahuievats'
Novi Sad Новий Сад/Novyi Sad
Subotica Суботиця/Subotytsia

Slovakia – Словаччина/Slovachchyna 
Haniska Ганиська/Hanys'ka
Krásny Brod Красний Брід/Krasnyi Brid
Prešov Пряшів/Priashiv
Veľký Šariš Великий Шариш/Velykyi Sharysh

Switzerland – Швейцарія/Shveitsariya 
Genève Женева/Zheneva
Lausanne Лозанна/Lozanna

See also

List of European exonyms

Ukrainian language
Lists of exonyms